English singer and songwriter Ellie Goulding has recorded songs for four studio albums and guest features. After signing a contract with record label Polydor Records in July 2009, Goulding began to work on her debut studio album, Lights, which was ultimately released in February 2010. The first single released from the album was "Under the Sheets", which Goulding wrote in collaboration with Starsmith. Starsmith co-wrote four other songs and served as the album's primary producer. Goulding also collaborated with Jonny Lattimer on the singles "Starry Eyed" and "The Writer", and shared writing credits with Fraser T. Smith on "Your Biggest Mistake". In November 2010, the singer re-released Lights as Bright Lights, which included the standard version of the album and several new songs. She collaborated with Richard Stannard and Ash Howes on "Lights" and recorded a cover version of Elton John's "Your Song". At this time, Goulding also contributed guest vocals on the song "Wonderman" for Tinie Tempah's debut studio album Disc-Overy (2010).

Goulding released her second studio album, Halcyon, in October 2012. In addition to reuniting with writers with whom she had previously worked, the singer collaborated with several new writers and producers. The album's lead single, "Anything Could Happen", was co-written by Goulding and Jim Eliot. They also wrote six other songs for the album. Goulding collaborated with Lattimer on the single "Figure 8"; she co-wrote "Explosions" with John Fortis and with Starsmith on "Dead in the Water". She also appeared as a featured artist on "I Need Your Love" by Calvin Harris from his third studio album 18 Months (2012). In August 2013, Halcyon was reissued as Halcyon Days. It was preceded by the single "Burn", which Goulding co-wrote with Ryan Tedder, Brent Kutzle, Noel Zancanella and Greg Kurstin.

Songs

Notes

References

External links
 List of Ellie Goulding songs at AllMusic

 
Goulding, Ellie